Craig Clinton Chaquico (or Chaquiço,  ; born September 26, 1954) is an American guitarist, songwriter, and composer. From 1974 to 1990 he was lead guitarist for the rock bands Jefferson Starship and Starship. In 1993, he started a solo career as an acoustic jazz guitarist and composer.

Early life
Chaquico was born and raised in Sacramento, California and attended La Sierra High School in the suburb of Carmichael. His mother, Muriel, was a state government employee, and his father, Bill, owned an upholstery business. Both were of Portuguese descent. He had an older brother named Howard. The household was a musical one; Chaquico recalls, "My mom and dad were musicians and played around the house all the time. I thought everybody played the piano and organ like Mom and the sax and accordion like Dad together after dinner." He began playing the guitar as a young boy, when his parents bought him his first guitar at the age of ten.

When Chaquico was twelve, the car he and his father were traveling in was hit head-on by a drunk driver. Both of his arms were broken, as were his leg, ankle, foot, wrist, and thumb. During physical therapy, his father told him that guitarist Les Paul had been in a car accident and had played guitar to help himself heal. His father promised to buy him a Les Paul guitar when he got better. Although he could play only the high E string of his acoustic guitar due to his casts, he benefited from playing and his father kept his word about the Les Paul.

Career

Chaquico began performing in clubs in his teens. His English teacher Jack Traylor asked him to join the band Steelwind, which performed in Sacramento and San Francisco Bay, and Traylor introduced him to Paul Kantner of Jefferson Airplane. Kantner invited him to a series of recording sessions. At 16 he recorded for the first time with Kantner and Grace Slick on their albums Sunfighter and Baron von Tollbooth & the Chrome Nun. He played on Slick's solo album Manhole in 1973. He played alongside Jerry Garcia, David Crosby, David Freiberg, and Carlos Santana.

After Jefferson Airplane broke up, its remaining members formed Jefferson Starship. Chaquico joined the band in 1974. Jefferson Starship released nine platinum and gold selling albums between 1974 and 1984, including Red Octopus, which was certified double-platinum in 1995. He wrote or co-wrote "Fast Buck Freddy", "Love Too Good", "Rock Music", "Jane", "Find Your Way Back", and "Layin' It on the Line".

The name "Jefferson Starship" was retired in March 1985 after Kantner left the band and sued the remaining members, who reformed under the name "Starship". All other band members, including Chaquico, remained with the band. Starship recorded hits such as "We Built This City", "Starship", and "Nothing's Gonna Stop Us Now". Chaquico and Starship appeared on MTV videos on a regular basis and performed at the first MTV Spring Break special in Daytona Beach in 1986. Chaquico left Starship in 1990.

Having become disappointed with the direction Starship was going, Chaquico formed Big Bad Wolf and recorded one album in that band. He began a solo career that explored world music, new age, and contemporary jazz. His first album, Acoustic Highway (1993), was the number one Independent New Age Album of the Year in Billboard Magazine and a number one on the Billboard New Age Albums chart, while his second album, Acoustic Planet (1994), reached number one on the same chart and received a Grammy Award nomination for Best New Age Album. The album borrowed from African and Native American music. The song "Just One World" was launched into space on a satellite that was part of NASA's Space Ark program.

In 2017 Chaquico filed suit against the remaining members of Jefferson Starship, including David Freiberg and Baldwin, over the use of the band name on tour billings and merchandise, citing the 1985 agreement to retire the band name. In 2018 the suit was dismissed after an undisclosed settlement was reached.

Guitars
Chaquico's first guitar was a Winston acoustic which his mother bought for him when he was 10 years old after he'd given up his parents' idea that he would play an accordion. He played a '57 Les Paul Goldtop on the first two Jefferson Starship albums and tours, Dragon Fly (1974) and Red Octopus (1975), on such songs as "Miracles". He also soon added a rare '59 Les Paul Sunburst to his collection which he played on the next two albums, Spitfire (1976) and Earth (1978) and can be heard on such songs as "With Your Love", "Count on Me", and "Runaway". Both Les Paul Guitars and the Bassman amps, along with several other valuable guitars, were stolen and/or destroyed in a riot in Lorelei, Germany, in 1978, when Grace Slick was unable to perform and the show was cancelled. Into the '80s, Chaquico was sponsored by Carvin Guitars and often appeared on tour, in the studio and in guitar magazine ads playing a Carvin V220 or a Carvin koa doubleneck played through Carvin amplifiers, his favorite being the Carvin X100B.

Philanthropy

Chaquico became a believer in the healing power of music after recovering from a car crash when he was twelve. With the National Association of Music Therapy, Beamz, Remo, and Washburn Guitars, he provided instruments to patients in hospitals. He has worked with organizations such as the American Music Therapy Association and Memory and Music which use music therapy with injured and traumatized people and those with various forms of dementia.

Awards and honors
 named him one of the 100 most influential jazz guitarists of all time. He was named Best Pop Instrumental Guitarist in Guitar Player magazine's 1997 Readers' Poll.

Discography
 Acoustic Highway (Higher Octave, 1993)
 Acoustic Planet (Higher Octave, 1994)
 A Thousand Pictures (Higher Octave, 1996)
 Once in a Blue Universe (Higher Octave, 1997)
 From the Redwoods to the Rockies with Russ Freeman (Windham Hill, 1998)
 Four Corners (Higher Octave, 1999)
 Shadow and Light (Higher Octave, 2002)
 Midnight Noon (Higher Octave, 2004)
 Holiday (Higher Octave, 2005)
 Follow the Sun (Shanachie, 2009)
 Fire Red Moon (Blind Pig, 2012)

With Jefferson Starship
 Dragon Fly (Grunt, 1974)
 Red Octopus (Grunt, 1975)
 Spitfire (Grunt, 1976)
 Earth (Grunt, 1978)
 Freedom at Point Zero (Grunt, 1979)
 Modern Times (Grunt, 1981)
 Winds of Change (Grunt, 1982)
 Nuclear Furniture (Grunt, 1984)

With Starship
 Knee Deep in the Hoopla (Grunt, 1985)
 No Protection (RCA/Grunt, 1987)
 Love Among the Cannibals (RCA, 1989)

With Paul Kantner, Grace Slick
 Sunfighter (Grunt, 1971)
 Baron von Tollbooth & the Chrome Nun (Grunt, 1973)

With Grace Slick
 Manhole (Grunt, 1973)

With Jack Traylor and Steelwind
 Child of Nature (Grunt, 1973)

With Big Bad Wolf
 Big Bad Wolf (1998)

As guest
With 3rd Force
 3rd Force (Higher Octave, 1994)
 Force of Nature (Higher Octave, 1995)
 Vital Force (Higher Octave, 1997)
 Force Field (Higher Octave, 1999)
 Gentle Force (Higher Octave, 2002)

With others
 Joan Burton, Only a Moment Away (1993)
 Commander Cody and His Lost Planet Airmen, Rock 'n Roll Again (1977)
 Cusco, Apurimac III: Nature Spirit Pride (1997)
 Russ Freeman, From the Redwoods to the Rockies (1998)
 Gregg Rolie, Gregg Rolie (1985)
 Tom Scott, New Found Freedom (2002)
 Mickey Thomas, Alive Alone (1981)

See also
List of ambient music artists

References

1954 births
20th-century American guitarists
20th-century American male musicians
21st-century American guitarists
21st-century American male musicians
American jazz guitarists
American male guitarists
American male jazz musicians
American musicians of Portuguese descent
American rock guitarists
Capitol Records artists
Guitarists from San Francisco
Jazz musicians from San Francisco
Jefferson Starship members
Lead guitarists
Living people
New-age guitarists
RCA Records artists
Smooth jazz guitarists
Sony BMG artists